John C. Milhiser is an American attorney who served as the  United States Attorney for the United States District Court for the Central District of Illinois from 2018 to 2021. Prior to becoming a U.S. Attorney, Milhiser was the Sangamon County State's Attorney. In January 2022, Milhiser announced he would seek the Republican nomination for Illinois Secretary of State in the 2022 election.

Education 

Milhiser received his undergraduate degree from James Madison University and his Juris Doctor from the University of Illinois College of Law.

Legal career 
He started his legal career in the Sangamon County State's Attorney's office in 1997 and spent time in the juvenile, civil, and felony divisions before entering private practice in 2003. He returned to the State's Attorney's Office in 2008 as the First Assistant State's Attorney. Milhiser served as adjunct professor at Springfield College in Illinois/Benedictine University from 2004 to 2009. He taught courses in public speaking, state and local government, and federal government. He served as the president of the Illinois State's Attorneys Association.

The Illinois Supreme Court appointed then-Sangamon County State's Attorney John Schmidt to a judgeship in Illinois's 7th Circuit Court. On September 28, 2010, Milhiser was chosen by the Sangamon County Board to serve as the new State's Attorney until the 2012 general election. Milhiser, endorsed by the Sangamon County Republican Party, defeated Ron Tupy, longtime chief legal counsel for the Illinois Prisoner Review Board by a three-to-one margin in the 2012 Republican primary and defeated Democratic candidate and labor attorney Ron Stradt in the general election. As the State's Attorney, he tried serious felony cases, including first degree murder, armed violence, attempted murder of a police officer, and sexual assault cases. Dan Wright was appointed his successor as State's Attorney and sworn into office on October 30, 2018.

U.S. Attorney for the Central District of Illinois 

On August 16, 2018, President Donald Trump announced his intent to nominate Milhiser to be the U.S. Attorney for the Central District of Illinois. On August 21, 2018, his nomination was sent to the United States Senate. On January 2, 2019, his nomination was confirmed by voice vote.

On February 8, 2021, he along with 55 other Trump-era attorneys were asked to resign. On February 11, 2021, Milhiser submitted his resignation, effective February 28, 2021.

Personal life 

He and his wife Gail live in Springfield with their two daughters, Abby and Katie Mae.

References

External links
 Biography at Justice.gov

Living people
20th-century American lawyers
21st-century American lawyers
Benedictine University faculty
Illinois lawyers
James Madison University alumni
State attorneys
University of Illinois College of Law alumni
United States Attorneys for the Central District of Illinois
Year of birth missing (living people)
Illinois Republicans
People from Springfield, Illinois